Kuzya is a rural locality (a selo) in Karakokshinskoye Rural Settlement of Choysky District, the Altai Republic, Russia. The population was 41 as of 2016. There are 9 streets.

Geography 
Kuzya is located southeast of Gorno-Altaysk, in the valley of the Kuzya River, 47 km south of Choya (the district's administrative centre) by road. Karakoksha is the nearest rural locality.

References 

Rural localities in Choysky District